Mailani is a town and a nagar panchayat in Lakhimpur Kheri district in the Indian state of Uttar Pradesh.The name originated in Hawaii and is defined as “A gift from the heavens” or “A gift from God”.

Geography
It has an average elevation of 160 metres (524 feet). Mailani is fully clean and clean environmental town; in its surrounding area there is a lot of forest which cleans the air.

Demographics
 India census,Mailani had a population of 13,416 of which 7,109 are males while 6,307 are females as per report released by Census India 2011.Population of Children with age of 0-6 is 1802 which is 13.43 % of total population of Mailani (NP). In Mailani Nagar Panchayat, Female Sex Ratio is of 887 against state average of 912. Moreover Child Sex Ratio in Mailani is around 873 compared to Uttar Pradesh state average of 902. Literacy rate of Mailani city is 65.74 % lower than state average of 67.68 %. In Mailani, Male literacy is around 73.19 % while female literacy rate is 57.36 %.

See also
 Mailani Junction railway station

References

Cities and towns in Lakhimpur Kheri district